"Last Remains" is a 2020 storyline published by Marvel Comics, starring the character Spider-Man. The events in this story seem to be a consequence of the events that occurred in 2007's One More Day storyline. This storyline features Spider-Man fighting against a new enemy, called Kindred who has taken control of Miles Morales, Spider-Gwen, Spider-Woman, Anya Corazon, and Julia Carpenter. The entire storyline lasts from The Amazing Spider-Man (vol. 5) #50–55, with several tie-ins, and #56–57 being the epilogues. The main story received mixed to positive reviews, with critics praising the art style, and the character analysis of Spider-Man, but there was heavy criticism on the pacing, the unresolved plot threads, and the identity of Kindred.

Plot summary

Main story 
After Spider-Man threw Norman Osborn off the ship and left him in the wreckage, Sin-Eater returns to normal and shoots Norman Osborn with his rifle, knocking him out. Kindred uses a centipede to communicate with Sin-Eater and calls him a hypocrite, stating that Sin-Eater hates people who have sins in them, yet he is full of sins and kills Sin-Eater, absorbing his sins. Kindred used Sin-Eater's sins to create constructs that attack the ship Spider-Man is on a ship underwater with Miles Morales, Spider-Gwen, Spider-Woman, Anya Corazon, and Julia Carpenter. The sins possess the other spider heroes, and they attack Spider-Man.

The possessed spider heroes brutally beat down Spider-Man, with Spider-Man realizing that him throwing out Norman Osborn caused him to lose control and not be aware of what was happening. Spider-Man tries to hold back, fearing he might kill his friends, but the possessed spider heroes brutally attacked him. The possessed Miles breaks a window, which causes water to flood in. Spider-Man uses his webbing to lift the ship on land, but the spider heroes ambush him, with Kindred mocking Spider-Man for trying to save his enemies. Kindred uses a possessed Anya to inject a spider venom (that can kill an elephant) to watch Spider-Man suffer before ordering the possessed heroes to swing away.

Spider-Man starts swinging through the city and crashes through trash cans before walking to Sanctum Sanctorum and knocks on the door. Doctor Strange opens the door, and Spider-Man collapses in front of him. Upon recovering, a downcast Peter tells Strange about something that had occurred, with the doctor being upset that Peter made a deal with a demon and didn't expect any consequences. Aiming to help rectify the evil, as Strange inquires about the Order, a demon-possessed Silk invades from the window directly above them. As Norman revives under Ravencroft newly cleansed of his evil, after telling the guards he needs no help, Dr. Kafka (who was a clone of a dead person in the Clone Conspiracy) views his now visible evidence of villainy as more than ample reason for her brand of help. While Sin-Eater's followers are arrested by the NYPD, Norman pleads for her to help him find Stanley's master, "Kindred", who aims to enact a worse event upon the city. Despite the clear presence of his crimes and the description of danger Norman made Kindred out to be, when Kafka asks to know his reasoning for saving such a person, Norman answers that Kindred is his son.

Norman discusses with Doctor Kafka about his original psychological fears of the Green Goblin, once fearful of his own reflection as a result. He equates this to selling his soul to a demon, now feeling the guilt for all the evils he inflicted on the world, especially upon Spider-Man. Kafka tells Norman that making amends is a painful process, and inquires more on Kindred, who Norman said was Harry. Norman blames Kindred's evil on the cruelty he inflicted on Harry, warning that he knows the next phase in his plan to destroy Spider-Man and New York. Norman realizes the full impact of what he's done, crying in frustration at wanting only to hold his baby boy again, and the destruction he'll bring. Aiming to help, Kafka asks the repentant Norman that an intermediary between them would help build a dialogue, asking if he knows someone Harry would listen to. At John F. Kennedy International Airport, Mary Jane Watson returns to New York for a short duration in her filming schedule, happy to be home.

Spider-Man and Doctor Strange manage to hold down the demon-possessed Silk. Spider-Man admits that Sin-Eater is not the ones controlling his friends, but another villain named Kindred. Kindred uses Cindy to escape, and Spider-Man tells Doctor Strange that he didn't tell him the truth because he felt Kindred is his responsibility and admitted that he felt relieved that he threw Norman Osborn the ship and left him to die. Spider-Man tells Doctor Strange that he will take on Kindred, but he needs Doctor Strange's help since demon possession is not what Spider-Man is used to fighting. Doctor Strange agrees to Spider-Man's offer, and gives him the Hand of Vashanti (a magic weapon that Spider-Man used to fight off a mystical villain named Shade in the past) to allow him to go to the astral plane. However, the Hand of Vashanti does not work because Spider-Man made a mystical agreement with someone (although Doctor Strange does not know this). Doctor Strange tells Spider-Man he can't help him, and casts Spider-Man outside so he can deal with the possessed spider heroes. However, its revealed that before Spider-Man collapsed in front of Doctor Strange, he contacted the Black Cat beforehand. The Black Cat manages to steal the Hand of Vashanti, while also recording Doctor Strange's chants. Spider-Man uses the Hand of Vashanti once more, but finds the astral plane in ruins and sees a projection of Mary Jane being swallowed by centipedes. Spider-Man wakes up in the middle of the grave and digs himself out. He explores the grave, and enters a room where Kindred is waiting with the corpses of Gwen Stacy, George Stacy, Richard and Mary Parker, Flash Thompson, Uncle Ben, Ned Leeds, Jean DeWolff, and Marla Jameson (J. Jonah Jameson's wife).

Sin-Eater wakes up and sees his gang making sure he's okay. Sin-Eater sees footage of the possessed spider-heroes attacking and wreaking havoc across New York City. Meanwhile, Doctor Strange arrives in Black Cat's apartment and asks her where the Hand of Vashanti is. The Black Cat tries giving Doctor Strange a fake version of the Hand of Vashanti, but Doctor Strange sees right through the Black Cat and agrees to take her with him to save Spider-Man. Mary Jane is on a cab when a car slams into her, knocking her out. She awakens to see Norman Osborn trying to save her, and she passes out. Sin-Eater begs Kindred's forgiveness and says he will not renounce his master's name. Sin-Eater kills a dissenter who was planning on leaving, and reveals that he is planning to kill Morlun (who escaped from his prison in Spider-Geddon) in order to steal his powers to kill the spider-heroes.

Spider-Man fights against Kindred, remembering that Kindred killed Mendel Storm and Mysterio, and revived Sin-Eater. Spider-Man is angry that Kindred desecrated the corpses of his loved ones, and manages to gain an upper hand by punching through Kindred's chest. But Kindred uses his tendrils to surprise Spider-Man, and brutalizes him before sending him in front of the Brooklyn Bridge where he sees the possessed spider-heroes causing mass havoc. Spider-Man sees Spider-Gwen about to throw Miles Morales off the bridge, and starts begging to Kindred. Spider-Man says his friends didn't do anything, and that if Kindred lets them go he can have him. Kindred agrees, freeing the spider heroes but snapping Spider-Man's neck.

The spider-heroes regain consciousness, but everyone is running from them. Doctor Strange and the Black Cat arrive, and say that Spider-Man is in danger and that he was kidnapped by Kindred. Meanwhile, Sin-Eater orders his followers to rob from a vault which contained the Queen's Spider morphing bio-weapon, which transformed New York into Spider-Island a while back. Although eradicated, Sin-Eater needed the last few vials they kept for study to ready his trap for Morlun. He does so by exposing his followers to the samples, mutating them into Arachnoids. Miles Morales, Spider-Woman, Spider-Gwen, Anya Corazon, Julia Carpenter, and the Black Cat head back to the Sanctum Sanctorum where Doctor Strange will create a spell that allows them to go to the astral plane, and the Black Cat stands in the real world to make sure nothing happens to them, as well as protecting the Hand of Vashanti. At Ravencroft, Mary Jane recovers from her injuries in Kafka's office with Norman Osborn, and beats him with a lamp in response to his approaching her. To have her understand, Norman explains Sin-Eater cleansing him and Kindred is really Harry. With Ashley Kafka confirming Norman's honesty of goodness, Mary Jane still distrusts them, as last she saw Harry he was a good guy. But Norman asserts it is him, yet he explains the full truth would only hurt them more. Norman cites Peter's nightmares and Mary Jane's own feelings of a looming threat at night, as those feelings were Kindred and their only way to stop Harry was to rely on Mary Jane's help.

Peter Parker is dreaming about the day Harry Osborn returned from Europe, but he also sees Mary Jane Watson leaving the party. Peter tries going to her but a group of people block his path. Harry Osborn introduces his girlfriend Lily Cooper and Peter's future girlfriend Carly Cooper while saying ""You know the worst thing about Hell, fellas? The parties suck." Peter starts to realize what is happening, as Harry demands Peter repeat what he had said that day before he gave his toast: "Speak of the devil and he appears." Kindred visits his sleeping son before returning and revives Peter Parker. Kindred tells Peter that he knew who he truly was, but just did not want to accept it. Kindred tells him to accept it because the two of them have work to do, because what's even more important than who Kindred is, is what he wants. Kindred removes the bandages over his face and Peter is shocked that Kindred is actually Harry Osborn.

Morlun kills the mutated Sin-Eater followers and confronts Sin-Eater. Morlun gains the upper hand easily due to his overwhelming super-strength, speed, and durability while noticing that Sin-Eater has something "unholy" behind his mask. Fueled by survival instinct and unsure if he still has the power to takes Morlun's abilities without Kindred's blessing, he triggers a trap shotgun before he can be killed that shoots Morlun in the back, seemingly killing him. As the spider-heroes and Strange navigate Peter's Dreamscape in the Astral Plane, Strange notes the desolate realm only reflects the state of Peter's soul. As Peter only recently passed by, his recent path is hidden, so they split into groups to find an exit to Peter. Spider-Gwen talks to Julia Carpenter, where she feels guilty on how she indirectly made Peter drop his guard and cause all of them to be possessed, but Julia Carpenter consoles her by saying all the death and loss made Peter feel responsible for with each defeat, driven by instinct to win and save more lives next time. Spider-Gwen saves her from a demonic sniper (the same sniper who shot Aunt-May in Back in Black) while Miles and Silk are attacked by a kaiju Kingpin and a demonic Aunt May. After Doctor Strange and Jessica Drew save them, they are confronted by a demonic Mary Jane Watson. Doctor Strange tells the spider-heroes to leave to give them time, and the spider-heroes escape the Astral Plane. The spider-heroes arrive at Kindred's graveyard, unaware that Sin-Eater is hiding them behind a tombstone.

Peter tells Harry that he can't believe he's evil, and Harry knocks him down. Peter gets angry and starts attacking Harry, but Harry easily beats him up and kills him over and over, each time reviving him. Harry Osborn reveals that he plans to show Peter what Hell is, that Hell is the absence of light and hope, and is worse than death itself. After many kills and revivals, Harry shows Peter that dying is easy but the punishment in Hell is suffering your personal sins. Harry explains he didn't even hurt Peter's friends; that was all on him due to his actions on being close to them. Harry explains that he revived the Sin-Eater to reform his father, but Peter stopped him because of his self-righteousness. Harry explains that Peter Parker's fatal flaw is that he always thinks he knows what is best for everyone, and that his hubris causes his loved ones to either get hurt or die. But instead of Peter accepting his mistakes, he chose to bury them or ignore them, like what he did to Norman Osborn in "Sins Rising". Harry is also disgusted that Peter tried to bargain and make the deal with him while also not revealing the truth to his allies like Doctor Strange. Peter sees Sin-Eater shooting Morlun, and also sees Sin-Eater waiting for the spider-heroes. A frantic Peter brings up their deal, to which Kindred notes that he had kept his end of the deal, that their arrival was an unintended consequence of Peter's actions and thus doesn't absolve him. Since they came for Peter, Kindred asks his confused old friend what else he did to bring unintended suffering onto others. Kindred urges the begging Peter to answer quickly, presenting on a large mirror display that Mary Jane Watson is entering his cemetery.

A few minutes earlier, Mary Jane is talking with Norman Osborn and says that she will never trust him because he is pure evil, but goes out in the cemetery. Meanwhile, Miles Morales, Julia Carpenter, Anya Corazon, Spider-Gwen, Spider-Woman, and Silk go out in the cemetery when they are attacked by Sin-Eater. Spider-Woman realizes that Sin-Eater absorbed the powers and abilities of Morlun. Realizing that her precognitive abilities could be the key, Julia willingly allows her to get shot by Sin-Eater. Sin-Eater absorbs her abilities, but also gains her precognition abilities. Sin-Eater sees Kindred is really Harry Osborn, and realizes that he was working for someone who was full of sin. Sin-Eater shoots himself, and disappears in a flash of light. Just then, Kindred uses his abilities to kidnap the spider-heroes. It is later revealed that Norman Osborn did not have his sins cleansed and is still evil; and he is working with the Kingpin to kill Kindred.

Kindred has Peter tied up in a crypt with all of the spider-heroes unconscious, and Mary Jane Watson appears in the front door. Peter attacks Kindred because he was being too close to Mary Jane, but Kindred easily overpowers him and nearly kills him again before Mary Jane tells him to stop. They both sit down at a table, while Norman Osborn tells the Kingpin she's in. Kindred unmasks himself as Harry Osborn, and he reminisces the past where Peter was supposed to be a great scientist, Mary Jane was going to be a famous actress, and Harry was going to inherit the Osborn company. Harry blames Peter for not telling him that his father was the Green Goblin, stating that the only reason why Peter didn't tell Harry the truth was not because his father lost his memory, but because he forgot Peter's true identity. Harry Osborn calls out Peter's selfishness and fear, stating that all his friends and family died because of it and he needs to confess. Peter says he's sorry but he doesn't know what Harry wants him to confess, but it causes Harry to be even more angry and Harry beats him up. Mary Jane tells him to stop, but Harry explains that he needs to kill Peter because Peter will bring death and suffering to everyone else. Mary Jane offers herself up, but just before Harry is about to make a move, the Green Goblin appears, shocking Kindred. The Green Goblin reveals that ever since Harry infected him with a centipede, turning him into Carnage, he has taken precautions, which is why he's still evil. He throws a bomb, mortally wounding Mary Jane, and during the chaos Harry/Kindred and the Green Goblin attack each other. The Green Goblin tells Kingpin to activate something, and darkness slowly creeps toward the people. Peter asks Mary Jane if she's okay, and before everything goes dark Mary Jane says "I'm going to be okay... just trust me."

Epilogue
It is revealed that Green Goblin threw only a flash grenade, which didn't injure Mary Jane. Kingpin used Spot to create a Darkforce Dimension similar to what Hydra did to New York City in Secret Empire. Mary Jane Watson takes the rest of the spider-heroes to safety while Spider-Man, Green Goblin and Kindred confront each other. During the chaos, the sins that Kindred took were freed and returned to their original hosts in Sins Rising, which also revives Morlun and the Juggernaut. Kindred tells the two of them that he wanted Spider-Man to remember what he did, while he also wanted Green Goblin to leave Norman Osborn, but realized that failed and both Peter Parker and Norman Osborn don't remember what happened, before Kindred is encased in a black cube. Peter escapes while Kingpin and his soldiers take Kindred into custody. While Carlie Cooper (Spider-Man's ex girlfriend) goes to take a taxi, she meets a reformed Overdrive who woke from his coma and asks Carlie to go on a date. While Aunt May is helping one of her coworkers, she meets Martin Li who says someone is going to kill him before he collapses in front of her. Later that night, Kingpin wants to beat Kindred to death for embarrassing him in the past (by reviving Kingpin's wife and taking away from him) but Norman Osborn convinces Kingpin to let him talk to Kindred. Norman Osborn tells his workers to leave, and is revealed that he was just faking being evil and had his sins cleansed. Norman Osborn is confused on why he's still good and wants to change for the better and promises to find out what Kindred is talking about. Just then, Spider-Man crashes through the window and tells Norman Osborn that they need to talk.

Before Spider-Man confronted Norman Osborn, he reunited with Mary Jane and the Spider-heroes. Spider-Gwen is angry that Spider-Man won't tell them whats going on and calls out Spider-Man's hubris but Mary Jane calms everyone down by saying that he will tell everyone when he's ready, and Julia Carpenter agrees with Mary Jane. The spider-heroes decide to take down the villains who got back their sins, and calls themselves The Order. In the present, Spider-Man angrily confronts Norman Osborn since he let Mary Jane be in the way of danger when Spot used his powers. Norman Osborn explains that he's genuinely good, but Spider-Man doesn't believe him, saying that everytime Norman Osborn does something he hurts Spider-Man and his closest friends. Norman Osborn admits he has done bad things and wants Spider-Man and him to team up to fix Harry Osborn. Spider-Man tells Norman Osborn to let Harry rot in prison because Harry is too far gone ever since Harry killed Spider-Man and brought him back to life multiple times. Spider-Man says he is done with the Osborns, and if Spider-Man hears Harry escape, he will bring down Norman Osborn. When Norman Osborn tries holding Spider-Man back, Spider-Man punches him and nearly beats him to death but after remembering what Kindred did he stops and swings away. It is revealed that Kindred wanted to be captured all this time. Meanwhile, Carlie Cooper looks at the graves Kindred exhumed to torture Spider-Man, and uncovers something which shocks her. She contacts Mary Jane and tries to leave her a message, but is struck by one of Kindred's centipedes. Spider-Man goes back to Mary Jane exhausted, he tells her that nothing is over.

Critical reception
According to Comic Book Roundup, Amazing Spider Man Vol 5 Issue 50 received a score of 7.1 out of 10 based on 13 reviews. Quin Tassin from Multiversity Comics wrote ""The Amazing Spider-Man #50" is a competently written but ultimately disappointing landmark issue in Nick Spencer's take on our favorite web-slinger."

According to Comic Book Roundup, Issue 50.LR Tie-In received a score of 7.6 out of 10 based on 8 reviews. David Weber from Monkeys fighting Robots wrote "An issue full of gorgeous art, that falls short on having a continuously engaging story."

According to Comic Book Roundup, Issue 51 received a score of 7.9 out of 10 based on 11 reviews. David Brooke from AIPT wrote "While it can be frustrating to try to piece together what is going on, it's hard to deny the general mood and atmosphere of this story suit the spooky season and feels entirely different. For that, The Amazing Spider-Man #51 is an interesting foray into a dark place that is unusual and intriguing."

According to Comic Book Roundup, Issue 51. LR Tie-In received a score of 7.2 out of 10 based on 8 reviews. Harlan Ivester from Comics: The Gathering wrote "As usual, this .LR issue is really required reading for Spencer's Spider-Man story. Thankfully, it's worth the price of admission. There are some questionable or concerning elements, but the ride is enjoyable especially thanks to fantastic art from Vicentini and Menyz. Give this a read."

According to Comic Book Roundup, Issue 52 received a score of 8.4 out of 10 based on 8 reviews. Chris Aiken from Black Nerd Problems wrote "Patrick Gleason's art matches the tone of the issue. Every panel is rough, and I especially love how Peter's suit deteriorates from the beginning to the end of the battle. The possessed Spider-Family members have some pretty unique designs as well. We leave off on a hell of a cliffhanger, but I'm pretty sure it's not the end. Hopefully, we explore a bit more about Harry's turn to Kindred and his goal for Peter."

According to Comic Book Roundup, Issue 52. LR Tie-In received a score of 7.5 out of 10 based on 8 reviews. Megan Peters from Comicbook.com wrote "The Amazing Spider-Man's "Last Remains" puts forth one of its most raw chapters yet this week" 

According to Comic Book Roundup, Issue 53 received a score of 6.9 out of 10 based on 9 reviews. Kevin Lainez from Comic Book Revolution wrote "Amazing Spider-Man #53 is all about the big reveal of Peter Parker finding out who Kindred really is. From that perspective Nick Spencer did a great job building up that reveal by using controversial events in Spider-Man's history to create a strong foundation for why this revelation had such an impact on Peter Parker. Unfortunately not much else happens in Amazing Spider-Man #53 as Spencer has left all the other sub-plots of "The Last Remains" to be told in the tie-in issues."

According to Comic Book Roundup, Issue 53. LR received a score of 6.3 out of 10 based on 6 reviews. Harven Ivester from Comics: The Gathering wrote "The art is pretty solid, but I do feel there is a step off. I loved the front half by Vicentini. His work is very sharp and clean, and there is so much depth and dynamics to be found in his action pieces. He does a great job at selling just how brutally fast Morlun is. Miyazawa's half, following the Order of the Web in Peter's psyche, is presented in a much more traditional layout. The cliffhanger is a standout page, making excellent use of a perceived field of depth. I think the Spider-Folk can look just a little wonky in some instances, but I can't complain about too much here."

According to Comic Book Roundup, Issue 54 received a score of 7.3 out of 10 based on 8 reviews. CJ from But Why Tho? wrote "Though it hits a few of the same notes as previous issues, Amazing Spider-Man #54 still manages to put our hero through the wringer. The stage is set for an epic confrontation that may cost Peter Parker everything and could set Kindred up as the foe who truly beat him."

According to Comic Book Roundup, Issue 54. LR Tie-In received a score of 7.5 out of 10 based on 8 reviews. Megan Peters from ComicBook.com wrote "The update checks on Mary Jane's unchecked feelings about Norman Osborne, and fans are met with a shocking fate for one of Peter's comrades."

According to Comic Book Roundup, Issue 55 received a score of 7.5 out of 10 based on 13 reviews. Deron Generally from Super Powered Fancast wrote "Patrick Gleason delivers some beautiful imagery throughout this issue. Not only do the characters look great, but the small details throughout the panels are evocative and visually engaging."

According to Comic Book Roundup, Issue 56 received a score of 6.6 out of 10 based on 10 reviews. wolfcypher from Weird Science Marvel Comics wrote "The writing and the pacing of this story is now wearing on my patience, as Nick Spencer has shockingly gone back to his frustrating habit of drawing things out much longer than they should be. It's a shame that what was a really engaging story is now being halted with an issue more interested in teasing upcoming stories and bringing in more ancillary characters with nothing to do with what we've been following in Last Remains. If you add up both the main issues and the point issues of Last Remains, this is effectively Last Remains Chapter 12, and its still…going…on…with no new answers or revelations."

According to Comic Book Roundup, Issue 57 received a score of 7.4 out of 10 based on 8 reviews. CJ from But Why Tho? wrote "Amazing Spider-Man #57 feels a little overpacked with plot points, though it contains a highly emotional confrontation between Spidey and Norman Osborn. Next issue has promised to start the next era of Spencer's run on the series, and I hope it keeps its focus on a singular plot/character."

Collected editions

References